Need Your Light is the fourth studio album by American indie rock band Ra Ra Riot, released on February 19, 2016. The album was produced by Ryan Hadlock, except for "Water" & "I Need Your Light" produced by Rostam Batmanglij.

Track listing

References

2016 albums
Ra Ra Riot albums
Albums produced by Rostam Batmanglij